Choqa Elahi (also Romanized as Choqā Elāhī and Cheqā Elāhī; also known as Cheqālahī, Cheqālā’ī, and Chellai) is a village in Sanjabi Rural District, Kuzaran District, Kermanshah County, Kermanshah Province, Iran. At the 2006 census, its population was 125, in 33 families.

References 

Populated places in Kermanshah County